The Kitchen Toto is a 1988 British drama film written and directed by Harry Hook and starring Edwin Mahinda, Bob Peck and Phyllis Logan.

Plot
In Kenya in 1950, a British policeman takes a murdered black priest's son to live with him at his home as a houseboy.

Cast
 Edwin Mahinda as Mwangi
 Bob Peck as John Graham
 Phyllis Logan as Janet Graham
 Nicholas Charles as Mugo
 Ronald Pirie as Edward Graham
 Robert Urquhart as D.C. McKinnon
 Kirsten Hughes as Mary McKinnon
 Edward Judd as Dick Luis
 Nathan Dambuza Mdledle as Mzee, Mwangi's Father
 Ann Wanjuga as Mwangi's Mother
 Job Seda as Kamau
 Leo Wringer as Sergeant Stephen
 Paul Onsongo as Thenge Oath giver

References

External links

1987 films
1987 drama films
Films directed by Harry Hook
Films set in 1950
Films set in Kenya
Films set in the British Empire
Films shot in Kenya
British drama films
Black British cinema
Black British mass media
Black British films
Golan-Globus films
1988 drama films
1988 films
1980s English-language films
1980s British films